Bariarpur railway station is a railway station on Sahibganj loop line under the Malda railway division of Eastern Railway zone. It is situated at Bariarpur in Munger district in the Indian state of Bihar.

References

Railway stations in Munger district
Malda railway division